The Isness is a 2002 album by experimental electronica group The Future Sound of London, released under the alias Amorphous Androgynous (except in the US, where it was released as FSOL for commercial reasons). An expanded version was released called The Isness and the Otherness, a two disc special edition containing The Isness on disc one and The Otherness, featuring additional tracks and recordings, on disc two.

The album is the first by FSOL (as Amorphous Androgynous) to delve into psychedelic rock territory, although there are a few solid electronica tracks the majority is more progressive rock than electronica. This has come to mixed reviews with the majority being positive. Some say they had over extended their reach and others seemed to understand what they were doing.

Release mixup
Several versions of the album exist, partially due to several last-minute changes to the track listing. Original promotional versions, mastered at Abbey Road studios, were set for release in May 2002. However, the album was put on hold, according to Gaz Cobain, due to an excess of "masculine energy". A second promotional version was released, with a track list similar to the final version, but in the same sleeve as the initial version, leading to a number of misleading reviews with incorrect track titles. The final released version of the album matched this second promo, with the addition to the album's short instrumental title track (and a slightly edited version of "The Mello Hippo Disco Show").

Upon the album's release in August 2002, more confusion occurred when the band's American label, Hypnotic, distributed 2,500 copies of the original mix of the album. The album was recalled, but many copies had been bought and still exist as rarities. The mix is significantly different from the final mix: "The Mello Hippo Disco Show" is an entirely different version, "The Galaxial Pharmaceutical" exists as a full track rather than being cut in two, "Guru Song" features lyrics sung by a female vocalist, "Elysian Feels" contains a significantly different breakbeat and is in a higher key, and both "Divinity" and "Go Tell It To The Trees Egghead" feature in slightly longer forms. "Yes My Brother" and "Goodbye Sky" are not present, replaced by "The Lovers" and "The Isness".  To confuse matters more, the vinyl version of the album contained an exclusive track entitled "Chawawah", only previously heard on the band's website in 2001.

2004's double-disc UK compilation "The Isness & The Otherness" (with "The Otherness" released as its own disc in the US) compiled most of the tracks, plus selected remixes and some exclusive pieces, only missing the Abbey Road mix of "The Galaxial Pharmaceutical", plus "Yes My Brother", which featured in an extended version as "The Prophet" on 2005 album Alice in Ultraland.

Track listing

Disc one: The Isness
"The Lovers" – 6:04
"The Isness" – 3:00
"The Mello Hippo Disco Show" – 5:25
"Goodbye Sky (Reprise)" – 1:14
"Elysian Feels" – 4:47
"Go Tell It To the Trees Egghead" – 4:28
"Divinity" – 7:27
"Guru Song" – 2:49
"Osho" – 2:14
"Her Tongue Is Like a Jellyfish" – 2:34
"Meadows" – 3:29
"High Tide on the Sea of Flesh" – 5:27
"The Galaxial Pharmaceutical" – 14:32

Disc two: The Otherness
"Elysian Feels" (Abbey Road version) – 6:03
"Yo-Yo" (Abbey Road version) – 4:31
"Goodbye Sky" – 4:34
"The Lovers (Love Is the Lover)" – 7:02
"Maharishi Raga" – 4:12
"The Band (Divinity)" – 6:02
"Rural Green" – 3:43
"Chawawah" – 4:03
"She Sells Electric Ego" – 6:41
"Chinese Whispers" – 1:00
"Slomo" – 3:16
"The Conga Run" – 5:38
"The Ram" – 1:55
"Toy Piano" – 1:03

Abbey Road promotional version
"Elysian Feels" – 6:03
"The Mello Hippo Disco Show" – 4:32
"Goodbye Sky" (reprise) – 1:10
"Osho" – 2:14
"The Galaxial Pharmaceutical" – 15:03
"Yes My Brother" – 0:52
"Go Tell It To the Trees Egghead" – 5:31
"Divinity" – 7:57
"Guru Song" – 3:45
"Her Tongue Is Like a Jellyfish" – 2:33
"Meadows" – 3:28
"High Tide On the Sea of Flesh" – 5:25
"Goodbye Sky" – 4:43

Vinyl version
"The Lovers" – 5:52
"High Tide On the Sea of Flesh" – 5:24
"The Mello Hippo Disco Show" – 5:49
"Divinity" – 7:25
"Guru Song" – 2:45
"Osho" – 2:12
"Her Tongue Is Like a Jellyfish" – 2:35
"Meadows" – 3:27
"Elysian Feels" – 4:45
"Goodbye Sky" – 1:11
"Go Tell It To the Trees Egghead" – 4:25
"Chawawah" – 4:02
"The Isness" – 2:59
"The Galaxial Pharmaceutical" – 14:30

Crew
Dougans and Cobain enlisted a large group of friends, famous and not, to help them with the music arrangement and performances; the list reads thus:
Richard Ashcroft, Alex Balanescu, Donovan, Clio Gould, Levine Andrade, Sue Monks, Philip Bainbridge, Christene Charly, Gary Lucas, Stinky Rowe, Baluji Shrivastav, Mikey Rowe, Randy Hope, Taylor Gospel Choir, Chris Margary, Fayaz Virgi, Kevin Robinson, The Cabbage Orchestra, The Major, Sam Pickins, Albert Ross Junior, Sir Daniel Pemberton, Bertie, Sara Gepp, The Vaudeville Stage and Big Screen FX Singers, Catrin Jones, Ben Pitt, Jeniffer Underhill, Vulu Krakovic, Charles Cross, Herb Moon, Merlin Sturt, Wayne Urqhart, Future Sonic Orchestra Limited, Linda Lewis, Joss, Dominic Glover, Anjali Sage, Mike McEvoy (AKA Michael J McEvoy), Phil Eastop, Kate St. John, Morven Bryce, Helen Binney, Jane Fenton, Christene Jackson, Joanna Archard, Herbie Flowers, Sarah Tilley, Mark Eades, GloriaGee, Rechenda Elmhurst, John-Llewelyn Evans, Christine Settle, Jacqueline Goddard, Adrian Osmond, Jon English, Thelma Owen, Alexa Hamilton, Tim Weller, Tom Swift, Dan Swift, and Big Freddy Teddy as well as long-time collaborators Max Richter, Philip Pin, Riz Maslen and Richie Thomas. Brian and Gaz are again credited as Stone Freshwaters and The One Man Band of Cosmos respectively.

Divinity
"Divinity" was released as a promo-single in 2003. "The Band Mix" version is an edit of the version on The Otherness. The "Spector Mix" is a new version, with drums throughout, giving it a very radio-friendly feel.

Track listing
 Divinity (Spector mix) (3:59)
 Divinity (The Band mix) (4:34)
 Divinity (album edit) (3:38)

Crew
Engineer – Stone Freshwaters, Yage
Producer – FSOL
Written By – B. Dougans, G. Cobain

References

External links
 

2002 albums
Astralwerks albums
The Future Sound of London albums
Virgin Records albums